This list of the prehistoric life of Nebraska contains the various prehistoric life-forms whose fossilized remains have been reported from within the US state of Nebraska.

Precambrian
The Paleobiology Database records no known occurrences of Precambrian fossils in Alabama.

Paleozoic

 †Achistrum
 †Acroplous
 †Acroplous vorax
 †Adacrinus
 †Adacrinus edema – type locality for species
 †Aesiocrinus
 †Aesiocrinus detrusus
 †Agassizodus
 †Agassizodus variabilis
 †Aglaocrinus
 †Aglaocrinus compactus
 †Allosocrinus
 †Allosocrinus bronaughi
 †Ameura
 †Ameura missouriensis
 Ammodiscus
 †Amphiscapha
 †Amphiscapha muricata
 †Amphissites
 † Ananias
 †Ananias marcouiana – type locality for species
 †Anthracospirifer
 †Apographiocrinus
 †Apographiocrinus platybasis
 †Apographiocrinus typicalis
 †Atrypa
 †Aviculopinna
 †Barbclabornia
 †Barbclabornia luedersensis
 †Bathronocrinus
 †Bathronocrinus wolfriverensis
  †Belantsea
 †Belantsea occidentalis
 †Bobbodus – type locality for genus
 †Bobbodus schaefferi – type locality for species
 †Chonetes
 †Chonetinella
 †Cibolocrinus
  †Cladodus – type locality for genus
 †Cladodus knightianus – type locality for species
  †Composita
 †Composita subtilita
 †Concavicaris
 †Concavicaris sinuata – or unidentified comparable form
 †Contocrinus
 †Contocrinus stantonensis
 †Cooleyella
 †Coryellites
 †Costistricklandia
 †Costistricklandia castellana
 †Crurithyris
 †Crurithyris expansa
  †Ctenacanthus
 †Ctenacanthus amblyxiphias
 †Cymatospira
 †Cymatospira montfortianus
 †Delocrinus
 †Delocrinus admirensis
 †Delocrinus vastus
 †Delocrinus vulgatus
 †Deltodus
 †Derbyia
 †Derbyia crassa
 †Dibunophyllum
 †Ditomopyge
 †Ditomopyge scitula
 †Ditomopyge whitei
 †Elibatocrinus
 †Endothyra
 †Enteletes
 †Enteletes hemiplicata – or unidentified comparable form
 Eocaudina
 †Erisocrinus
 †Erisocrinus longwelli
 †Erisocrinus typus
 †Euphemites
 †Euphemites vittatus
 †Exocrinus
 †Exocrinus multirami
 †Exoriocrinus
  †Favosites
 †Fissodus
 †Fissodus inaequalis
 †Gilliodus
 †Gilliodus peyeri
 †Glabrocingulum
 †Glabrocingulum grayvillense
 †Glaukosocrinus
 †Glaukosocrinus berryi – type locality for species
  †Glikmanius
 †Glikmanius myachkovensis
 †Glikmanius occidentalis
 †Gorgonophontes
 †Gorgonophontes peleron – type locality for species
 †Graffhamicrinus
 †Graffhamicrinus boellstorffi – type locality for species
 †Graffhamicrinus magnijkus
 †Graffhamicrinus subcoronatus
 †Graphiocrinus
 †Graphiocrinus scopulus – or unidentified comparable form
 †Halogetocrinus
 †Halogetocrinus boellstorffae – type locality for species
   †Halysites
 †Helodus
 †Helodus rugosus
 †Heslerodus
 †Heslerodus divergens
 †Hollinella
 †Holmsella
 †Hustedia
 †Hustedia mormoni
 †Hypselentoma
 †Hypselentoma inornata – type locality for species
 †Hypselentoma perhumerosa
 †Hystriculina
 †Hystriculina wabashensis
 †Ianthinopsis
 †Ianthinopsis pulchellus
 †Iniopera
 †Iniopera richardsoni
  †Iniopteryx – type locality for genus
 †Iniopteryx rushlau – type locality for species
 †Iniopteryx rushlaui
 †Iniopteryx tedwhitei – type locality for species
 †Inioxyele – type locality for genus
 †Inioxyele whitei – type locality for species
 †Isorthis
  †Janassa
 †Janassa maxima – type locality for species
 †Janassa unguicula – type locality for species
 †Juresania
 †Kallimorphocrinus
 †Linoproductus
 †Lissochonetes
 †Lissochonetes geronticus
 †Lophophyllidium
 Macrocypris
  †Metacoceras
 †Microcaracrinus
 †Microcaracrinus twenhofeli
 †Monongahela
 †Moreyella
 †Mycterops
 †Mycterops whitei
 †Nebraskacrinus
 †Nebraskacrinus tourteloti
 †Neochonetes
 †Neochonetes granulifer
  †Neospirifer
 †Neospirifer dunbari
 †Nodosinella – tentative report
  †Orthacanthus
 †Orthacanthus compressus
 †Orthonema
 †Orthonema nebrascense – type locality for species
 †Orthonema subtaeniatum – type locality for species
 †Ozarkodina
 †Paleochiridota
 †Paramphicrinus
 †Parethelocrinus
 †Parethelocrinus variabilis
 †Parulocrinus
 †Parulocrinus blairi
  †Peachocaris
 †Peachocaris acanthouraea
 †Pentameroides
 †Pentameroides corrugatus
 †Peripristis
 †Peripristis semicircularis
 †Persephonichthys – type locality for genus
 †Persephonichthys chthonica – type locality for species
 †Petalocrinus
  †Petalodus
 †Petalodus alleghaniensis
 †Petalodus arcuatus – type locality for species
 †Petalodus destructor
 †Pharkidonotus
 †Pharkidonotus percarinatus – type locality for species
 †Phoebodus
 †Phoebodus knightianus – type locality for species
 †Plagioglypta
 †Plagioglypta meekiana – type locality for species
   †Platyceras
 †Platyxystrodus – tentative report
 †Platyxystrodus occidentalis – type locality for species
 †Plaxocrinus
 †Plaxocrinus crassidiscus
  Pleurotomaria
 †Pleurotomaria haydeniana
 †Plummericrinus
 †Polusocrinus
 †Polusocrinus rosa
 †Polypora
 †Porpites
 †Promexyele
 †Promexyele bairdi – type locality for species
 †Protocaudina
 Psammosphaera
 †Ptylopora
 †Punctospirifer
 †Punctospirifer kentuckensis
 †Reticulatia
 †Reticulatia huecoensis
 †Retispira
 †Retispira marcouianus – type locality for species
 †Rhipidomella
 †Rhipidomella carbonaria
 †Rhombopora
 †Romerodus – type locality for genus
 †Romerodus orodontus – type locality for species
 †Royalella
 †Royalella swallowiana – type locality for species
 †Sciadiocrinus
 †Sciadiocrinus humilis
 †Shumardella
 †Sibyrhynchus
 †Sibyrhynchus denisoni
 †Stearoceras
 †Stearoceras sublaeve – type locality for species
 †Stellarocrinus
 †Stellarocrinus stillativus
  †Stethacanthus
 †Stethacanthus altonensis
 †Streblodus
 †Streblodus angustus – type locality for species
 †Streptognathodus
 †Synarmocrinus
 †Synarmocrinus iatani
  †Syringopora
 †Tainoceras
 †Tainoceras nebrascense
 †Terpnocrinus
 †Tetravirga
 †Triceracrinus
 †Ulocrinus
 †Vertigocrinus
 †Vertigocrinus parilis
 †Wellerella
 †Wellerella cooperi – or unidentified comparable form
 †Wellerella delicatula – or unidentified comparable form
 †Wellergyi
 †Wellergyi subdecussatus – type locality for species

Mesozoic

 †Acanthichthys – type locality for genus
 †Acanthichthys major – type locality for species
 †Acritodromum – type locality for genus
 †Acritodromum ellipticum – type locality for species
 †Anisodromum – type locality for genus
 †Anisodromum wolfei – type locality for species
 †Arcellites
 †Arcellites disciformis
 †Citrophyllum
 †Citrophyllum doylei – type locality for species
  †Collignoniceras
 †Collignoniceras percarinatum
 †Collignoniceras praecox
 †Collignoniceras vermilionense
 †Crassidenticulum
 †Crassidenticulum decurrens
 †Densinervum – type locality for genus
 †Densinervum kaulii – type locality for species
 Dicotylophyllum
 †Dicotylophyllum aliquantuliserratum – type locality for species
 †Dicotylophyllum angularis – type locality for species
 †Dicotylophyllum expansolobum – type locality for species
 †Dicotylophyllum myrtophylloides – type locality for species
 †Dicotylophyllum rosafluviatilis – type locality for species
 †Didromophyllum – type locality for genus
 †Didromophyllum basingerii – type locality for species
  †Didymoceras
 †Didymoceras cheyennense
  †Inoceramus
 †Inoceramus apicalis
 †Inoceramus cuvieri
 †Inoceramus fragilis
 †Landonia – type locality for genus
 †Landonia calophylla – type locality for species
 †Longstrethia – type locality for genus
 †Longstrethia varidentata – type locality for species
 †Minerisporites
 †Minerisporites dissimilis – type locality for species
  †Mosasaurus
 †Mytiloides
 †Mytiloides labiatus
 †Mytiloides mytiloides
 †Pabiania – type locality for genus
 †Pabiania variloba – type locality for species
 †Pandemophyllum – type locality for genus
 †Pandemophyllum attenuatum – type locality for species
 †Pandemophyllum kvacekii – type locality for species
 †Perotriletes
 †Perotriletes striatus
 †Pseudoperna
 †Pseudoperna congesta
 †Reynoldsiophyllum
 †Reynoldsiophyllum nebrascense – type locality for species
 †Rhaeboceras
 †Rosselia – or unidentified comparable form
 †Scaphites
 †Scaphites patulus
 †Skolithos – or unidentified comparable form
  †Styxosaurus – type locality for genus
  †Volviceramus
 †Volviceramus involutus

Cenozoic

Selected Cenozoic taxa of Nebraska

 Acer
 Acipenser
 Acris
 †Acris crepitans – or unidentified comparable form
 †Acritohippus
 †Acritohippus isonesus
 †Aelurodon
  †Aepycamelus
 †Aepycamelus major
 †Aepycamelus robustus
 Agkistrodon
 †Agnotocastor
  †Agriochoerus
 †Agriotherium
 †Aletomeryx
 †Alforjas
 Alligator
 Alnus
 †Ambrosia
 †Ambystoma
 †Ambystoma maculatum
 †Ambystoma tigrinum
  †Amebelodon
 Amia
 †Amia calva
 Ammospermophilus
 †Amphechinus
  †Amphicyon
 †Amphicyon frendens – type locality for species
 †Amphicyon galushai – type locality for species
 †Amphicyon ingens
  †Amphimachairodus
 †Anchitheriomys
  †Anchitherium
 †Andrias
 Antrozous – or unidentified comparable form
 Apalone
 †Apalone spinifera
 †Aphelops
 Aplodinotus
 †Aplodinotus grunniens
 Aramus
 †Archaeocyon
 †Archaeohippus
  †Archaeotherium
 †Arctodus
 †Arctodus simus
 †Arctonasua
 Ardea
 Arizona
 †Artemisia
 †Astrohippus
 Atractosteus
 †Atractosteus spatula
 Baiomys
 Balearica
  †Barbourofelis
 †Barbourofelis fricki
 †Barbourofelis morrisi – type locality for species
 †Barbourofelis whitfordi – type locality for species
 Bassariscus
 †Bathornis
 †Bathornis veredus
 †Bathygenys
 Betula – or unidentified comparable form
 Bison
  †Bison latifrons
 Blarina
 †Blarina brevicauda
  †Blastomeryx
 †Blastomeryx gemmifer – type locality for species
 †Bootherium
 †Bootherium bombifrons – type locality for species
  †Borophagus
 †Borophagus diversidens
 †Borophagus pugnator
 †Borophagus secundus
 †Bothriodon
 †Brachycrus
 †Brachypsalis
 †Brachyrhynchocyon
 †Brontops
 Bufo
 †Bufo cognatus
 Burhinus
 Buteo
 †Calippus
  †Camelops
 †Camelops hesternus
 Canis
  †Canis dirus
 †Canis edwardii
 †Canis ferox
 †Canis latrans
 †Canis lepophagus
 †Capromeryx
 †Carpocyon
 Carya
 Castor
 †Castor californicus – or unidentified comparable form
  †Castoroides
 Cedrela
 Celtis
 †Cephalogale
  †Ceratogaulus
 †Ceratogaulus anecdotus
 †Ceratogaulus hatcheri
 †Ceratogaulus rhinocerus
 †Cervalces
 Chaetodipus
 †Chaetodipus hispidus
 †Chamaecyparis
 Charina
 Chelydra
 †Chelydra serpentina
 †Chelydrops
 †Chelydrops stricta – type locality for species
 Chrysemys
 †Chrysemys picta
  Cladrastis
 Clethrionomys
 †Clethrionomys gapperi – or unidentified comparable form
 Cnemidophorus
 †Cnemidophorus sexlineatus
 Cocculus
 †Colodon
 Coluber
 †Coluber constrictor
  †Conuropsis
 †Cordia
 †Cormocyon
 †Cormohipparion
 †Cosoryx
 †Cosoryx furcatus
  †Cranioceras
 Crataegus
 Crotalus
 †Crotalus horridus
 Cryptotis
  †Cynarctoides
 †Cynarctoides acridens
 †Cynarctoides emryi – type locality for species
 †Cynarctoides roii
 †Cynarctus
 †Cynelos
 †Cynodesmus
 Cynomys
 †Daphoenictis
 †Daphoenodon
  †Daphoenus – type locality for genus
 Dasypus
 †Dasypus bellus
 †Desmatippus
 †Desmatochoerus
 †Desmocyon
  †Diceratherium
 Dicrostonyx
 †Dicrostonyx torquatus
  †Dinictis
 †Dinohippus
 †Dinohyus
 †Dinohyus hollandi – type locality for species
 †Diospyros
 Dipodomys
 †Dipoides
 †Diprionomys
 †Domnina
  †Dromomeryx
 †Dromomeryx borealis – type locality for species
 †Ectopocynus
 †Ekgmowechashala
 †Ekgmowechashala philotau
 Elaphe
 †Elaphe guttata
 †Elaphe obsoleta
 †Elaphe vulpina
  †Elomeryx – tentative report
 Emydoidea
 †Emydoidea blandingii
 †Enhydrocyon
 †Epicyon
 †Epicyon haydeni
 Equus
 †Equus conversidens – or unidentified comparable form
 †Equus francisci
  †Equus simplicidens
 Erethizon
 †Erethizon dorsatum
 Esox
  †Eubelodon
 †Eucastor
  †Eucyon
 †Eucyon davisi
 Eumeces
 †Euoplocyon
 Felis
 †Floridatragulus
 †Fraxinus
 †Gaillardia
 Geochelone
 Geomys
 †Geomys bursarius
 Geranoaetus
 Gerrhonotus
 †Gigantocamelus
 Glyptemys
  †Gomphotherium
 Gopherus
 Graptemys
 Grus
 †Hayoceros
 †Helodermoides
 †Helodermoides tuberculatus
 †Hemiauchenia
 †Hemiauchenia macrocephala
 †Herpetotherium
 †Herpetotherium fugax
  †Hesperocyon
 †Hesperotestudo
 Heterodon
 †Heterodon nasicus
 †Heterodon platyrhinos
 †Heteromeryx
  †Hipparion
 †Hipparion forcei
 †Hippotherium
 Holbrookia – tentative report
  †Homotherium
 †Homotherium crusafonti
 †Hoplophoneus
 †Hyaenodon
 †Hyaenodon crucians
 Hyla
 †Hyla gratiosa – or unidentified comparable form
 †Hyla squirella – or unidentified comparable form
 †Hyla versicolor – or unidentified comparable form
 †Hypertragulus
 †Hypisodus
  †Hypohippus
 †Hypolagus
 †Hypsiops
 †Hyracodon
 Ictalurus
 †Ictalurus punctatus – or unidentified comparable form
 Ilex
  †Indarctos
 †Ischyrocyon
 †Ischyromys
 Juglans
 †Kalobatippus
 Kinosternon
 †Kinosternon flavescens
 †Lambdoceras
 Lampropeltis
 †Lampropeltis calligaster
 †Lampropeltis getulus
 †Lampropeltis triangulum
 Lasiurus
 Leiocephalus
 Lepisosteus
 Lepomis
 †Lepomis microlophus
  †Leptauchenia
 †Leptocyon
 †Leptomeryx
 Lepus
 †Lepus californicus – or unidentified comparable form
 Lichanura
 Liquidambar
 †Longirostromeryx
 Lontra
 Lycopodium
  †Machairodus
 Macrochelys
 †Macrochelys temminckii
 Mahonia
 †Mammacyon
 †Mammut
 †Mammut matthewi
 †Mammuthus
  †Mammuthus columbi
 Martes
 Masticophis
 †Masticophis flagellum
 †Mediochoerus
 †Megacamelus
 †Megahippus
 †Megalictis
 †Megalictis ferox
 †Megalonyx
  †Megalonyx leptostomus
 †Megantereon – tentative report
 †Megatylopus
 †Meliosma
  †Menoceras
 Mephitis
  †Mephitis mephitis
 †Merychippus
 †Merychyus
 †Merycochoerus
  †Merycodus
 †Merycoides
 †Merycoidodon
 †Mesocyon – report made of unidentified related form or using admittedly obsolete nomenclature
 †Mesohippus
 †Mesoreodon
  †Metailurus
 †Metalopex
 †Metatomarctus
 †Michenia
 Micropterus
 †Microtomarctus
 Microtus
 †Microtus ochrogaster
 †Microtus pennsylvanicus
 Micrurus
 †Migmacastor – type locality for genus
 †Migmacastor procumbodens – type locality for species
  †Miniochoerus
 †Miohippus
 †Miotapirus
 †Miotapirus harrisonensis
 †Miotylopus
 †Monosaulax
  †Moropus
 Mustela
 †Mustela frenata
 †Mustela nigripes
 †Mustela vison
 Mycteria
 †Mylagaulus
 †Mylohyus
 Myodes
 Myotis
 †Nannippus
 †Nanotragulus
 Natrix – or unidentified comparable form
 †Neohipparion
  Neophrontops
 Neotamias
 Neotoma
 Nerodia
 †Nerodia rhombifera
 †Nerodia sipedon
 †Nexuotapirus
  †Nimravides
 †Nimravides pedionomus – type locality for species
 †Nordenosaurus
 †Nototamias
 †Nyssa
 Ochotona
 †Ochotona spanglei – or unidentified comparable form
  Odocoileus
 †Odocoileus virginianus
 †Oligobunis
 Ondatra
 †Ondatra zibethicus
 Onychomys
 †Onychomys leucogaster – or unidentified comparable form
 Opheodrys – or unidentified comparable form
 Ophisaurus
 †Ophisaurus ventralis
 Ortalis
 †Osbornodon
 †Osbornodon iamonensis
 †Oxetocyon
 †Oxydactylus
  †Palaeocastor
 †Palaeogale
 †Palaeolagus
 Panthera
 †Panthera leo
 †Paracynarctus
 †Paradaphoenus
 †Paraenhydrocyon
 †Parahippus
  †Paramylodon
 †Paramylodon harlani
 †Paramys
 Parascalops – or unidentified comparable form
 †Paratomarctus
 †Paratylopus
 †Parictis
 †Paronychomys
 †Parvitragulus – tentative report
 †Pediolophodon
 †Pediomeryx
  †Peltosaurus
 †Peltosaurus granulosus
 †Peraceras
 Perognathus
 Peromyscus
 †Phasianus
 †Phenacocoelus
 Phenacomys
 †Phenacomys intermedius – or unidentified comparable form
  †Phlaocyon
 †Phlaocyon annectens
 †Phlaocyon mariae – type locality for species
 †Phlaocyon minor
 †Phlaocyon yatkolai – type locality for species
 Phrynosoma
  †Phrynosoma cornutum
 Picea
 Pinus
 Pituophis
 †Pituophis catenifer
 †Pituophis melanoleucus
 Platanus
  †Platybelodon
 †Platygonus
 †Platygonus compressus
 †Pleiolama
 †Plesiogulo
 †Pliauchenia
 †Pliocyon
 †Pliohippus
 †Pliometanastes
 †Plionarctos
 †Plithocyon
 †Poebrotherium
  †Pogonodon
 Populus
 †Proantilocapra
  †Procamelus
 †Procamelus occidentalis
 †Procastoroides
 †Procranioceras
 †Promartes
 †Promerycochoerus
 †Proscalops
 †Prosynthetoceras
 †Proterix
  †Protoceras
 †Protohippus
 †Protolabis
 †Protomarctus
 Prunus
 †Prunus acuminata – type locality for species
 †Psalidocyon
 Pseudacris
 †Pseudaelurus
 †Pseudhipparion
 †Pseudocyon
 †Pseudolabis
  †Pseudoprotoceras
 Pterocarya
 †Pylodictis
 †Pylodictis olivaris
 Quercus
 †Quercus parvula – type locality for species
  †Ramoceros
 †Ramoceros
 †Rana
 †Rana catesbeiana
 †Rana clamitans
 †Rana pipiens
 †Rana sylvatica
 †Regina – or unidentified comparable form
 Reithrodontomys
 †Repomys
  Rhineura
 Rhinocheilus
 †Rhinocheilus lecontei
 †Ribes
  †Robinia
 Salix
 Salvadora
 †Sarcobatus – or unidentified comparable form
  †Satherium
 †Satherium piscinarium
 Scalopus
 †Scalopus aquaticus
 Scaphiopus
 †Scaphohippus
 Sceloporus
 †Sceloporus undulatus
 Sequoia – or unidentified comparable form
 †Serbelodon
  †Sespia
 Sigmodon
 Siren
 Sistrurus
 †Sistrurus catenatus
 †Skinnerhyus – type locality for genus
  †Smilodon
 †Smilodon fatalis – or unidentified comparable form
 Sorex
 †Sorex arcticus
 †Sorex cinereus
 †Sorex palustris
 Spea
 †Spea bombifrons
 Spermophilus
 †Spermophilus elegans
 †Spermophilus franklinii – or unidentified comparable form
 †Spermophilus richardsonii
 †Spermophilus tridecemlineatus
 Spizaetus
  †Stegomastodon
 †Steneofiber
 †Stenomylus
 †Stenomylus gracilis
 †Stenomylus hitchcocki – type locality for species
 Sthenictis
 †Stylemys
 †Subdromomeryx
 †Subdromomeryx antilopinus
  †Subhyracodon
 †Sunkahetanka
 †Sunkahetanka geringensis
 Sylvilagus
 †Sylvilagus floridanus
 Synaptomys
 †Synaptomys cooperi
  †Syndyoceras
 †Syndyoceras cooki – type locality for species
  †Synthetoceras
 †Synthetoceras tricornatus
 Tamias
 †Tanymykter
  Tapirus
 †Tapirus johnsoni – type locality for species
 †Tapirus polkensis – or unidentified comparable form
 Taxidea
 †Taxidea taxus
  †Teleoceras
 †Teleoceras major – type locality for species
 †Temnocyon
 †Tephrocyon
 Terrapene
 †Terrapene ornata – type locality for species
 †Tetrabelodon
 Thamnophis
 †Thamnophis proximus
 †Thamnophis radix
 †Thamnophis sirtalis
  †Thinobadistes
 Thomomys
 †Ticholeptus
 Tilia
  †Titanotylopus
 †Tomarctus
 †Tomarctus brevirostris
 †Tomarctus hippophaga – type locality for species
 Trachemys
 †Trigenicus
  †Trigonias
 †Trigonictis macrodon
 Trionyx
 Tropidoclonion – or unidentified comparable form
 †Tylocephalonyx
 Ulmus
 Urocyon
 †Ursavus
 †Ustatochoerus
 Vitis
 Vulpes
 †Vulpes velox
  †Ysengrinia
 †Yumaceras
 Zapus
 †Zapus hudsonius
 †Zodiolestes
  †Zygolophodon

References
 

Nebraska
Nebraska-related lists